Mokumea is a genus of sea snails, marine gastropod mollusks in the family Columbellidae, the dove snails.

Species
Species within the genus Mokumea include:
 Mokumea albomarginata (Ohamoto & Habe, 1979)
 Mokumea albovittata (Lopes, Coelho & Cardoso, 1965)
 Mokumea anceps K. Monsecour & D. Monsecour, 2018
 Mokumea divaricata (Pilsbry, 1904)
 Mokumea fuscolineata (Thiele, 1930)
 Mokumea mokum Faber, 2004
 Mokumea parvula (Viader, 1951)
 Mokumea yuhitai Habe, 1991
 Mokumea zeleensis Drivas & Jay, 1997

References

Columbellidae